Avianus (or possibly Avienus; c. AD 400) a Latin writer of fables, identified as a pagan.

The 42 fables which bear his name are dedicated to a certain Theodosius, whose learning is spoken of in most flattering terms. He may possibly be Macrobius Ambrosius Theodosius, the author of Saturnalia; some think he may be the emperor of that name. Nearly all the fables are to be found in Babrius, who was probably Avianus's source of inspiration, but as Babrius wrote in Greek, and Avianus speaks of having made an elegiac version from a rough Latin copy, probably a prose paraphrase, he was not indebted to the original. The language and metre are on the whole correct, in spite of deviations from classical usage, chiefly in the management of the pentameter. The fables soon became popular as a school-book. Promythia and epimythia (introductions and morals), paraphrases, and imitations were frequent, such as the Novus Avianus of Alexander Neckam (12th century).

Fables
De nutrice et infanti
De testudine et aquila - noticed under The Tortoise and the Birds
De cancris - noticed under The Snake and the Crab
De vento et sole - The North Wind and the Sun
De asino pelle leonis induto - The Ass in the Lion's Skin
De rana et vulpe - The Frog and the Fox
De cane qui noluit latrare - The Mischievous Dog
De camelo
De duobus sociis et ursa - The Bear and the Travelers
De calvo
De ollis - The Two Pots
De thesauro
De hirco et tauro
De simia
De grue et pavone
De quercu et harundine - The Oak and the Reed
De venatore et tigride
De quattuor iuvencis et leone - The Bulls and the Lion
De abiete ac dumis - The Fir and the Bramble
De piscatore et pisce - The fisherman and the little fish
De luscinia
De cupido et invido
De Baccho - noticed under The Statue of Hermes
De venatore et leone
De fure et parvo
De leone et capella
De cornice et urna - The Crow and the Pitcher
De rustico et iuvenco
De viatore et fauno - The Satyr and the Traveller
De apro et coco
De mure et tauro
 - God helps those who help themselves
De ansere ova aurea pariente - The Goose That Laid the Golden Eggs
De cicada et formica - The Ant and the Grasshopper
De simiae gemellis
De vitulo et bove
De leone et cane
De pisce et focis
De milite veterano - noticed under The Trumpeter Taken Captive
De pardo et vulpe
De olla cruda
De lupo et haedo

Editions
 Hendrik Cannegieter (1731)
 Lachmann (1845)
 Wilhelm Fröhner (1862)
 Emil Baehrens in Poetae Latini Minores (1879–1883)
 Robinson Ellis, The Fables of Avianus (1887)
 The Fables of Avianus, translated by David R. Slavitt, Johns Hopkins University Press 1993

See also
 Aviana gens

References

  Latin Wikisource

Further reading
 Lucian Müller De Phaedri et Aviani fabulis libellis (1875)
 Otto Unrein, De Aviani Aetate (1885), Jena dissertation
 Leopold Hervieux, Les Fabulistes latins (1894)
 The Fables of Avian translated into Englyshe ... by William Caxton at Westmynstre (1483).

5th-century Latin writers
5th-century Roman poets
Fabulists